Khabushan District is a district (bakhsh) in Faruj County, North Khorasan Province, Iran. At the 2006 census, its population was 15,334, in 4,166 families.  The District has one city Titkanlu. The District has two rural districts (dehestan): Hesar Rural District and Titkanlu Rural District.

References 

Districts of North Khorasan Province
Faruj County